Cyrtodactylus culaochamensis, the Cù Lao Chàm bent-toed gecko, is a species of gecko that is endemic to Vietnam.

References 

Cyrtodactylus
Reptiles described in 2020